This list of lost settlements in the United Kingdom includes deserted medieval villages (DMVs), shrunken villages, abandoned villages and other settlements known to have been lost, depopulated or significantly reduced in size over the centuries. There are estimated to be as many as 3,000 DMVs in England. Grid references are given, where known.

England

Note that in many cases English settlements are listed under the relevant historical county, rather than the modern administrative unit.

Bedfordshire
Stratton, near Biggleswade
Sheep Lane, between Woburn and Leighton Buzzard
Ruxox, near Ampthill
Kinwick, believed to be near Sandy
Elvedon, believed to be near Pertenhall

Berkshire
Barcote, near Littleworth,  (manor house survives) (now in Oxfordshire)
Beckett, near Shrivenham,  (manor house survives) (now in Oxfordshire)
Betterton, near Lockinge,  (manor house survives) (now in Oxfordshire)
Bockhampton, near Lambourn,  (manor house survives)
Calcote, near Hungerford (near,  (exact location unknown)
Carswell, near Littleworth,  (now in Oxfordshire)
Clapcot, near Brightwell,  (manor house survives)
Cruchfield, near Bray,  (manor house survives)
East Compton, near Compton,  (church survives)
Draycott, Longworth,  (now in Oxfordshire)
Eaton Hastings,  (church survives) (now in Oxfordshire)
Endloss Ditton, near Luton
Fulscot, near South Moreton,  (now in Oxfordshire)
Henwick, near Thatcham,  (manor house survives)
Hill End, near Wytham,  (now in Oxfordshire)
Hodcot, near West Ilsley, 
Holt, near Kintbury,  (manor house survives)
Langley, near Hampstead Norreys,  (manor house survives)
Inglewood, near Kintbury,  (manor house survives)
Maidencourt, near East Garston, 
Marlston, near Bucklebury,  (manor house survives)
Newton, near Buckland,  (manor house extant) (now in Oxfordshire)
Odstone, near Ashbury,  (now in Oxfordshire)
Purley Parva, near Purley,  (manor house extant)
Seacourt, near Wytham,  (good earthworks: road pattern discernible) (now in Oxfordshire)
Shalford, near Brimpton,  (manor house extant)
Sheffield, near Burghfield, 
East Shefford,  (manor house and church extant)
Shottesbrooke,  (manor house and church extant)
Southcote, near Denchworth,  (manor house extant) (now in Oxfordshire)
Stroud, near Cumnor,  (now in Oxfordshire)
Thrupp, near Radley,  (now in Oxfordshire)
Tubney, near Appleton,  (manor house extant) (now in Oxfordshire)
Whatcombe, near Fawley, 
Whitley, near Cumnor,  (exact location unknown) (now in Oxfordshire)
Woolley, near Chaddleworth,  (manor house extant)
Wyld Court, near Hampstead Norreys,

Buckinghamshire
From Beresford's Lost Villages  except Old Wolverton.
 Ackhampstead, near Frieth,  - no visible remains at the site
 Addingrove, near Oakley,  
 Doddershall, near Kingswood
 Ekeney, near Emberton (Borough of Milton Keynes)
 Fleet Marston, west of Aylesbury
 Old Wolverton (Milton Keynes)

Cambridgeshire
Includes former villages whose sites were in Huntingdonshire until the 1974 county boundary changes.
Botolph Bridge, near Orton Longueville
Whitwell, near Barton
Burghley, possibly under Burghley House
Clopton, Cambridgeshire, near Croydon
Cratendune, near Ely
Houghton, Cambridgeshire (medieval village)
Howes
Little Thetford near Little Thetford
Sawtry Judith, near Sawtry (community based around lost abbey)
Stonea Camp, deserted Iron Age hill fort in hamlet of Stonea
Washingley, near Folksworth
Weald and Wintringham, both near Eynesbury Hardwicke, St Neots

Cheshire
Tatton

Cumbria
Mardale
Snittlegarth

Derbyshire
Agden Side, near Agden Reservoir
Alkmonton medieval settlement, between Uttoxeter and Derby
Ashopton, submerged under Ladybower reservoir 
Cottons, near Normanton, Derby
Derwent, submerged under Ladybower reservoir 
Hungry Bentley, between Uttoxeter and Derby
Phoside, near Glossop.
Toxall, near Macclesfield

Devon
Hallsands - Village and beach. 
Hundatora, near Hound Tor (DMV. Now in the care of English Heritage )
Hutholes, Widecombe-in-the-Moor, Dartmoor.
New Quay (Devon) – A port on the river Tamar abandoned in the early 20th century.
Morwellham Quay – A port upstream from New Quay that was partially abandoned after the closure of most of the local mines in the early 20th century, now an open-air museum.
Gawton – A port on the river Tamar abandoned in the early 20th century.

Dorset
Tyneham (taken over by the British Armed Forces during World War II)
 Maryland, on Brownsea Island—The village was originally created to serve an unsuccessful pottery business. Its inhabitants were ultimately expelled by the island's owner.
Winterborne Farringdon

County Durham
Carlbury,  (mostly demolished in the late 1940s to make way for A67 road)
Ulnaby,  (abandoned in the 16th century)

Gloucestershire 
Charlton (demolished in the late 1940s to make way for an extension of Filton Airfield)
Lancaut
Northwick, near Blockley
Upper Ditchford

Herefordshire
 Chilstone
 Devereux
 Edvin Ralph
 Hampton Wafer
 Hewland
 Hoarwithy
 Holme Lacy
 Kilpeck
 Little Cowarne
 Lower Bullingham
 Studmarsh
 Wacton
 Wolferlow

Hertfordshire 
Aldwick, 
Alfledawich (Beauchamps), 
Alswick, 
Aspenden II, 
Ayot St Lawrence, 
Ayot St Peter, 
Berkeden (Berkesdon Green), 
Betlow, 
Bordesden (Bozen Green), 
Boxbury, 
Bricewold
Brickendon, 
Broadfield, 
Broadmead, 
Burston, 
Caldecote, 
Chaldean, 
Chesfield, 
Childwick, 
Cockenach, 
Cockhamsted, 
Corney Bury, 
Digswell, 
Flaunden, 
Flexmere, 
Gilston, 
Great Munden, 
Gubblecote, 
Hainstone
Hanstead, 
Hixham, 
Hodenhoe, 
Ichetone (Layston), 
Kitts End, 
Lewarewich (Leverage) near, 
Libury (Stutereshele), 
Mardley, 
Maydencroft (Furnival Dinsley), 
Minsden, 
Miswell, 
Moor Green, 
Napsbury, 
Nettleden II, 
Newsells, 
North Mymms, 
Oxwich near Codicote
Oston
Pendley, 
Plashes, 
Queenhoo, 
Quickswood, 
Sapeham
Stagenhoe, 
Stanstead Abbotts, 
Stevenage, 
Stivicesworde
Stocks, 
Stonebury, 
Temple Dinsley, 
Thorley, 
Throcking, 
Thundridge, 
Tiscott, 
Titburst (Theobald Street), 
Wakeley, 
Wandon, 
Wellbury, 
Welei (Wain Wood)
Wickham, 
Windridge, 
Wollenwick (Woolwicks),

Kent
See Lost villages of the Romney Marsh for more detail.
Buttdarts (over one of the larger marsh drains), 
Dengemarsh, south of Lydd
Dode (Dowde), in Luddesdowne parish near Gravesend
Eastbridge, 
Fairfield, 
Falconhurst, 
Galloways, not marked on OS Map: ?TR 0017
Hampton-on-Sea, 
Hope All Saints, 
Midley, SW of Old Romney, 
Orgarswick, NW of Dymchurch, 
Paddlesworth, near Snodland, 
Shorne, 
Shuart, 
Snave, 
Stone Chapel near Ospringe

Lancashire
Fairhurst, lost hamlet near Parbold
 Gambleside, abandoned in 1866
Greenbooth, abandoned and submerged village under a reservoir

Leicestershire

Aldeby SK552987 Deserted Medieval Village in Enderby, now known as St Johns after its ruined parish church
Allhallows SK785361 Lost place in Redmile, recorded as Alhallowes in 1579
Alton SK390148 Deserted Medieval Village in Ravenstone
Alwolton Lost place in Hoby, recorded in 1322 as Utteralwolton where Utter means outer or remote
Ambion SK400003 Deserted Medieval Village in Sutton Cheney, reputedly abandoned at the time of the Battle of Bosworth
Andreskirk SK392222 Deserted Medieval Village in Breedon on the Hill, located to its west
Atterton SP353983 Deserted Medieval Village
Baggrave SK697088 Deserted Medieval Village in Hungarton
Beacon Hill SK513146 Lost place in Woodhouse Eaves, site of an Iron Age hill fort, perhaps a lookout over the Soar valley for the Corieltauvi tribe
Beckingthorpe SK808394 Lost place in Bottesford, recorded as Beclintorp about 1300
Berehill SK587046 Lost place in St Margaret's Field, recorded as le Berehil in 1260, it lay outside the East Gate of Leicester, forming part of the east suburb and subsequently was named the Haymarket
Bescaby SK823623 Deserted Medieval Village
Bigging, Lost place in Leicester, recorded as le Bigginge in 1323, it was a group of buildings close to the abbey of St Mary de Pratis, perhaps near SK580062
Bishop's Fee SK505051 Lost Place in St Margaret's Field Leicester, recorded as feodo Episcopi in 1336 and called The Suburb in Domesday, it was the property of the Bishop of Lincoln and included St Margaret's Field
Bittesby Deserted Medieval Village, perhaps formed out of a larger, earlier parish centred on a former Romano-British settlement at Duninc Wicon that also included Ullesthorpe as an outlying settlement
Bradgate SK535103 Deserted Medieval Village in Newtown Linford, abandoned for the building of Bradgate House
Bradley SP823954 Lost place in Nevill Holt, recorded as Bradel in the 12th century, and the site of an Augustinian Priory from about 1200
Brascote SK443025 Deserted Medieval Village in Newbold Verdon
Brentingby SK784198 Deserted Medieval Village
Bromkinsthorpe SK560040 Lost place in St Mary's Field Leicester, now Braunstone Gate
Brooksby SK670160 Deserted Medieval Village
Bulwarks, The SK405233 Lost place in Breedon on the Hill, site of an Iron Age hill fort, perhaps in the western border zone of the Corieltauvi tribe
Burrough Hill SK770120 Lost place in Burrough on the Hill, site of an Iron Age hill fort, perhaps the central place of the Corieltauvi tribe before the Roman invasion
Burrowchurch SK835185 Lost place in Wymondham, located to its west
Canby SK605170 Lost place in Sileby which gave its name to one of the three Sileby medieval great fields
Charleyston Lost place in Charley recorded in 1280
Colby SK617090 Lost place in Thurmaston close to boundary with Humberstone
Cold Newton SK716065 Deserted Medieval Village
Cotes de Val SP553887 Deserted Medieval Village in Gilmorton
Dishley SK513212 Deserted Medieval Village
Dodyngton Lost place in Rearsby, recorded about 1480
Doveland SK560043 Lost place in St Mary's Field, Leicester, recorded about 1230
Duninc Wicon SP495870 Lost place in Ullesthorpe, recorded in 962AD, possibly to be rendered as Dunna's wic (vicus), it was perhaps the site of a Romano British township located towards Watling Street
Elmesthorpe SP460965 Deserted Medieval Village
Eye Kettleby SK734167 Deserted Medieval Village in Melton Mowbray
Foston SP604950 Deserted Medieval Village
Freake's Ground SK575054 Lost place in Leicester, recorded as Mr Freakes Land in 1625, it lay between the Groby and Fosse Roads, it became an extra-parochial area
Frisby SK704020 Deserted Medieval Village between Billesdon and Gaulby
Frogmire SK581052 Lost place in Leicester, recorded as Frogemere in 1196, it lay between two arms of the River Soar outside the North Gate, it is now represented by Frog Island
Garendon SK502199 Deserted Medieval Village in Loughborough
Gillethorp or Godthorp SK770100 Lost place included in Domesday as Godtorp and as Gillethorp in the Leicestershire Survey of about 1130, it lay between Somerby and Newbold Saucey
Gilroes SK560065 Lost place in Leicester Frith, recorded as Gilleuro in 1322
(Goadby Marwood) SK780270 Lost site of a minor Romano-British settlement, a vicus, established alongside the Roman road from the Fosse Way at Six Hills towards the Ermine Street at Spitalgate, near Grantham in Lincolnshire. There is no evidence of its location within the parish or its name
Gopsall SK353064 Deserted Medieval Village in Twycross
Great Stretton SK657005 Deserted Medieval Village, its parish church remains
Hamilton SK645075 Deserted Medieval Village in Barkby Thorpe
Hardwick Lost place in Bottesford, recorded about 1220 as Herdewic
Hardwick SP720970 Lost place in Shangton, recorded 1252 as Herdwyk
Hogston Lost place in Sileby, recorded in the 17th century as Hogston side
Holyoaks SP845957 Deserted Medieval Village in Stockerston
Hothorpe SP669851 Lost place in Theddingworth, in the 18th century the home of the Lord of the Manor, which at the time of Domesday extended south of the River Welland into present day Northamptonshire where it now lies
Hungerton SP625985 Lost place in Wigston Magna, recorded about 1285 as Hungertonhill, not to be confused with Hungarton
Hygham Lost place in Wycomb and Chadwell, recorded in 1582, it gave its name to one of the parish medieval great fields
Ingarsby SK684055 Deserted Medieval Village in Hungarton, often called Old Ingarsby to differentiate it from modern New Ingarsby which lies to the north west of Houghton on the Hill
Keythorpe SP765995 Deserted Medieval Village in Tugby
Kilwardby SK354166 Lost place in Ashby de la Zouch, now represented by Kilwardby Street
Knaptoft SP626895 Deserted Medieval Village, the remnants of the parish church remain
Knave Hill SP744943 Lost place in Stonton Wyville, a local name for Langton Caudle which is the site of an abandoned Saxon settlement pinpointed by archaeological excavation
Leesthorpe SK792136 Deserted Medieval Village in Pickwell
Leroes Lost place in St Margaret's Field Leicester, recorded in 1346 as le Leywro
Lilinge Lost place either between Ullesthorpe and Bitteswell or in Westrill and Starmore adjacent to Lilbourne Northamptonshire, it was included in Domesday in Guthlaxton Wapentake
Lindley SP365958 Deserted Medieval Village in Higham on the Hill, now under the Motor Industry Research Association (MIRA) Proving Ground
Longton Lost place in Humberstone, recorded in 1612
Lowesby SK725078 Deserted Medieval Village
Lowton Lost place in Humberstone recorded about 1480
Lubbesthorpe SK541011 Deserted Medieval Village
Luffnum Lost place in Humberstone, recorded about 1730, perhaps similar in origin to the place-name Luffenham in Rutland
Manduessedum SP330968 Lost Place in Witherley, it was a Romano British settlement extending into Mancetter Warwickshire at the junction of Watling Street and the Roman road Fenn Lane from Leicester
(Medbourne) SP796929 Lost Romano-British town on the Roman road from Godmanchester to Leicester. The site remains unknown, no name survives for the town and Medbourne field names do not indicate its probable location
Mirabel SP845957 Lost place in Stockerston, recorded as hermitagii de Mirabel in 1232, located close, and in opposition to the pagan centre at Holyoaks, it is now represented by Great and Little Merrible Woods
Misterton SP556840 Deserted Medieval Village, the parish church, the minster of the place-name, remains
Nafferton Lost place in Foston, recorded in 1619
Naneby SK435025 Deserted Medieval Village in Cadeby
Netone Lost place included in Domesday in Gartree Wapentake
Newarke, The SK582041 Lost place in Leicester, recorded as le Newerk in 1361, it lay outside the town wall by the castle and was itself walled round
Newbold Folville SK706120 Deserted Medieval Village in Ashby Folville
Newbold Saucey SK765090 Deserted Medieval Village in Owston
New Park of Bird's Nest, The SK560058 Lost place in Leicester Frith, recorded as Briddesnest in 1362, it is now represented by the New Parks suburb of the city
Normandy Lost Place in St Margaret's Field Leicester, recorded in 1453
Normanton Turville SP489995 Deserted Medieval Village
North Marefield SK752088 Deserted Medieval Village, now often called Old Marefield
Noseley SP733987 Deserted Medieval Village
Othorpe SP771995 Deserted Medieval Village in Slawston
Quenby SK702065 Deserted Medieval Village in Hungarton
Ratae Corieltauvorum SK582045 Lost place replaced by Leicester, it was the Romano British cantonal capital of the Corieltauvi (formerly known as Coritani) tribe whose previous centre was probably Burrough Hill in the county, and who named it Ratis before the Roman invasion. When, how and why Ratae/Ratis transformed into Legorensium by 787AD is unknown
Ringlethorpe SK776235 Deserted Medieval Village in Scalford, now the location of Goldsmith Grange
St Clement SK581048 Lost place in Leicester, recorded in 1220, it was one of its medieval parishes and lay in the west quarter
St Leonard SK580055 Lost place in Leicester, recorded in 1220, it was one of its medieval parishes and lay over the North, or St Sunday's Bridge
St Mary in Arden SP741875 Lost Place in medieval Great Bowden, now Market Harborough, perhaps the original centre of an early parish that included both Great and Little Bowden, any link with the Forest of Arden Warwickshire is unproven
St Michael SK584049 Lost place in Leicester, recorded in 1220, it was one of its medieval parishes and lay in the north quarter
St Peter SK585047 Lost place in Leicester, recorded in 1200, it was one of its medieval parishes and lay in the north quarter
Sauvey SK786052 Lost place in Withcote, recorded as Salvee in 1229, was the location of Sauvey Castle
Shelthorpe SK545185 Deserted Medieval Village in Loughborough
Schirdiccotes Lost place in Thurmaston, recorded about 1320, a similar name to Shirtecoat in Great Bowden
Schyrdaycotis Lost place in Newton Harcourt, recorded in the 14th century, a similar name to Shirtecoat in Great Bowden
Shirtecoat SP740900 Lost place in Great Bowden, recorded about 1250, located in the medieval great North Field of the parish, perhaps meaning derelict cottages or summer shelters
Schortecotes Lost place in Horninghold, recorded about 1300, perhaps a similar name to Shirtecoat in Great Bowden
Shoby SK683203 Deserted Medieval Village
Shouldercoates Lost place in Twyford, although only recorded in 1826 and as such a possible echo of a medieval name, it may be similar in meaning to Shirtecoat in Great Bowden or to be interpreted as the cottages on the hill shoulder
South Marefield SK746079 Lost place represented by modern Marefield, in Domesday it was included as alia Merdefelde to distinguish it from the now deserted North Marefield which was also called Old Marefield
Stapleford SK813183 Deserted Medieval Village
Staunton Harold SK379209 Deserted Medieval Village
Stocking, The SK583078 Lost place in Beaumont Leys Leicester, recorded as le Stokkynge in 1352, now represented by the Stocking Farm suburb of the city
Stormsworth SP583806 Deserted Medieval Village in Westrill and Starmore, the name has evolved into Starmore
Sysonby SK739190 Deserted Medieval Village in Melton Mowbray, traditionally where the River Eye became the River Wreake
Tomley SP552795 Lost place in Catthorpe, recorded as Tomlowe in 1343, perhaps relating to a Tom Thumb type character and to be rendered as Hobgoblin's Mound
Toston SK800370 Lost place in Bottesford, recorded as Toxtonhyl in 1304, now represented by Toston Hill
Tripontium SP535795 Lost Place in Shawell, perhaps commemorating stream crossings at Dow Bridge SK542782 in Catthorpe and Bransford Bridge SK519822 in Cotesbach, the third crossing was at Caves Inn in Shawell, it was a Romano British settlement extending into Warwickshire on Roman Watling Street located at modern Caves Inn Farm
Venonis SK474888 Lost place at the meeting point of Claybrooke Magna and Parva and Sharnford, now represented by High Cross, it was a Romano British settlement extending into Warwickshire at the crossing point of the Roman Fosse Way and Watling Street, inhabited by the Corieltauvi who named it The Place of the Tribe (Venonis)
Vernemeton SK650250 Lost place in Willoughby on the Wolds Nottinghamshire, A Romano British settlement on Fosse Way whose territory extended into Old Dalby and Wymeswold, Horrou and Harrowefield in Wymeswold probably relate to the same sacred grove commemorated in the name Vernemeton
Welby SK725210 Deserted Medieval Village
Wellsborough SK365024 Deserted Medieval Village in Sibson
Westcotes SK570300 Lost place in St Mary's Field Leicester
Westerby SP675925 Lost place incorporated with neighbouring Smeeton into Smeeton Westerby by 1279
Weston Lost place in Beeby, recorded in 1601, gave its name to one of the Beeby great medieval fields which lay west of the boundary with Hungarton
Weston SK303027 Deserted Medieval Village in Orton on the Hill, now the location of Moor Barns Farm
Westrill Lost place in Westrill and Starmore, recorded as Westerhyll in 1578, perhaps located at Gravel Hill SP580800
Westthorpe Lost place in Bottesford, recorded as Westorp in 1249. Easthorpe is still a settlement in the parish
Whatborough SK767060 Deserted Medieval Village
Whenham SK725238 Lost place in Ab Kettleby that gave its name to a field in the parish, it was probably sited close to Landyke Lane, the Roman road from the Fosse Way at Six Hills to Ermine Street near Grantham
Whittington SP486083 Deserted Medieval Village in Ratby
Willesley SK340146 Deserted Medieval Village
Willows SK660180 Deserted Medieval Village in Ragdale
Wistow SP644958 Deserted Medieval Village
Withcote SK797059 Deserted Medieval Village
Woodcote SK354187 Deserted Medieval Village in Ashby de la Zouch
Wyfordby SK792189 Deserted Medieval Village

Lincolnshire
Aunby, 
Avethorpe, Location unknown
Banthorp near Greatford, See Banthorpe Wood.
Casewick North East Uffington,   - The name survives in Casewick Hall.
Casthorpe near Barrowby,  (East Casthorpe),   (West Casthorpe) 
 Beckfield, Kirmond le Mire, 
 Birthorpe, Billingborough, 
 Burreth, Lincolnshire
Brauncewell, east of Modern Brauncewell, 
Bruer,  Controversially listed as DMV by Beresford & Hurst.
Butyate, near Bardney 
Coates medieval settlement, near Stow
Cold Hanworth medieval settlement, at Cold Hanworth
Crofton 
Dembleby Shrunken village 
Dunsby, east of Brauncewell     Note there is a surviving village of the same name in the south of the County.
 Elsthorpe, near Edenham. 
Gainsthorpe, near Kirton Lindsey,  (One of the best-preserved DMV sites in Britain, now in the care of English Heritage 
Ganthorpe, Stoke Rochford. 
Goltho,   
Graby shrunken village west of Dowsby, 
 Hanby,  
 Little Lavington, near Lenton,    Recorded as late as 1846.
Newbo near Barrowby,  
North Cadeby, 
 North Rauceby shrunken village,  
North Stoke, Stoke Rochford.
 Orford, south of Brookenby, 
 Osgodby, South of Lenton, Lincolnshire,  The name is preserved in the farm at the location, and in the parish name.
 Ouesby, Billingborough, 
 Ringsthorpe, west of Barkston,  
 Ringstone, south of Rippingale,  
 Roxton, south of Immingham. 
 Sempringham shrunken village,  
 Sapperton, Somewhere near Welbourn, See also un-named village near Welbourn,
Scott Willougbhy shrunken village 
 Silkby near Silk Willoughby, 
 Skinnand,   Shown on OS map
 Southorpe, near Edenham. 
 Sudwelle near Swayfield,    
Thorpe, Laythorpe and Burgh, location unknown, all associated with Kirkby la Thorpe
 Twyford south of Colsterworth,   Note: there is a similarly named surviving village at SK728103 - The name at Colsterworth is preserved in nearby woodland. 
Waterton, 
West Laughton, west of Laughton
Wyham, 
West Wykeham
East Wykeham
Wykeham (Nettleton)

Middlesex
Heathrow (sometimes "Heath Row", demolished in the 1940s to allow construction of London Heathrow Airport)

Norfolk

There are believed to be around 200 lost settlements in Norfolk. Many of these are deserted medieval villages.

Northamptonshire
See also List of lost settlements in Northamptonshire.
Achurch
Althorp, 
Appletree
Armston
Astwell
Astwick
Badsaddle, 
Barford, 
Boughton, 
Braunston Cleves or Fawcliff, 
Braunstonbury, 
Brime
Brockhall
Burghley
Calme
Caswell
Canons Ashby, 
Cotes
Coton, 
Cotton, near Grendon, 
Cotton Mill
Cotton Mallows
Chilcote, 
Churchfield
Church Charwelton, 
Doddington Thorpe, 
Downtown, 
Eaglethorpe
Eastern Neston
Edgcote
Elmington in Ashton
Elmington in Tansor
Elkington, 
Falcutt
Fawsley, 
Foscote
Faxton, 
Field Burcote
Foxley
Furtho
Glassthorpe, 
Glendon, 
Great Purston
Hale
Holdenby, 
Horton, 
Hothorpe, 
Kelmarsh, 
Kingsthorpe
Kirby, 
Kirby in Blakesley
Kirby in Gretton
Knuston, 
Lilford
Little Creaton, 
Little Newton, 
Little Oxendon, 
Lolham
Lower Catesby, 
Mawsley, 
Milton
Murcott, 
Muscott, 
Nether Catesby
Newbottle, 
Newbottle in Harrington
Nobold, 
Nobottle
Nunton
Papley
Perio
Pipewell, 
Potcote
Preston Deanery, 
Onley, 
Overstone, 
Rushton Saint Peter, 
Seawell
Sibberton
Silsworth, 
Snorscomb, 
Stanford, 
Steane
Strixton, 
Stuchbury
Sulby, 
Thorpe, 
Thorpe Lubenham
Thrupp, 
Torpel
Trafford
Upper Catesby, 
Upton
Walcot
Walton
Winwick, 
Wolfhampcote, 
Woodcroft
Wothorpe
Wythmail,

Northumberland
Anterchester, 
Bockenfield, 
West Backworth,

Nottinghamshire
Adbolton, 
Algarthorpe, 
Annesley, 
Babworth, 
Beesthorpe, 
Bilby, 
Bingham, 
Bolham, 
Broadbusk, 
Broxtowe, 
Carburton, 
Clowne, 
Clumber, 
Colston Basset, 
Over Colwick, 
Cratley or Crastell, 
Dallington, 
Danethorpe, 
East Chilwell, 
East Stoke, 
Farworth, 
Flawford, 
Fleecethorpe, 
Gleadthorpe, 
Greasley, 
Grimston Hill, 
Haughton, 
Hempshill, 
Hermeston, 
Holbeck, 
Holme Pierrepont, 
Horsepool, 
Keighton, 
Kilvington, 
Kinoulton, 
Knapthorpe, 
Langford, 
Little Gringley, 
Meering, 
Milnthorpe, 
Moorhouse, 
Morton in Babworth, 
Morton in Lenton, 
Nettleworth, 
Newbold
Normanton, 
Osberton, 
Ossington, 
Oswaldbeck, 
Plumtree, 
Rayton, 
Rempstone, 
Rufford, 
Serlby, 
South Wheatley, 
Stanton-on-the-Wolds, 
Sutton Passeys, 
Swanston, 
Thoresby, 
Thorney, 
Thorpe in the Glebe, 
Tiln, 
Wainscarre, 
Wansley, 
Warby, 
Welham, 
West Burton, 
Whimpton Village, 
Willoughby by Norwell, 
Willoughby by Walesby, 
Winkerfield, 
Wiverton, 
Woodcoates, 
Woolsthorpe,

Oxfordshire
For former villages whose sites were in Berkshire until the 1974 county boundary changes please see the Berkshire section, above.
Asterleigh, southwest of Kiddington, 
Brookend, northwest of Chastleton, 
Clare, northwest of Pyrton, 
Ditchley, south of Enstone, 
Dornford, northeast of Wootton, 
Hordley, southeast of Wootton, 
Nether Chalford, southeast of Old Chalford, 
Rycote, or Rycote Magna, southwest of Thame, 
Shelswell, west of Newton Purcell, 
Tusmore, south of Brackley, 
Wheatfield, south of Tetsworth, 
Widford, west of Swinbrook, 
Willaston, east of Hethe,

Rutland
Alsthope, east of Oakham
Exton shrunken village, 
Hardwick,  - Site of the Battle of Losecote Field
Horn, 
Ingthorpe,  Tinwell 
Martinsthorpe, south of Oakham, 
Pickworth shrunken village,

Shropshire

 Upton Cressett medieval settlement, at Upton Cressett

Somerset
Clicket, a small village abandoned by 1891.
Moreton, abandoned in the early 1950s to allow the creation of Chew Valley Lake reservoir.
Nether Adber, medieval settlement predating current village of Marston Magna.

Suffolk
 Akethorpe, now part of Lowestoft
 Alnesbourne in Hallowtree parish south-east of Ipswich
 Alston St. John
 Chilton, east of Sudbury
 Croscroft, near Sotterley in Wangford Hundred
 Dunningworth
 Easton Bavents, lost to coastal erosion
 Fakenham Parva
 Little Redisham, emparked with the parish combined with Ringsfield in 1627
 Monks Risbridge, between Stradishall and Barnardiston
 Manton, also known as Manetuna (named in the Domesday Book along with the entry for Kettlebaston)
 Slaughden, lost to coastal erosion
 Sotterley, suspected emparked village
 Wordwell
 Worlingham Parva, near North Cove. At the Domesday survey probably part of Worlingham

Surrey
Cuddington (demolished to allow construction of Nonsuch Palace; now lies under Nonsuch Park)
Gatton

Sussex
Apuldram 
Balmer 
Balsdean 
Barpham 
Binderton 
Burton 
Charlton 
Cudlow 
East Itchenor 
Erringham 
Ford 
Hangleton 
Heene (in Worthing) 
Kingston Buci 
Lordington 
Lowfield Heath (in Surrey until 1974; church extant) 
Manxey 
Monkton 
Northeye 
Old Shoreham 
Pangdean 
Parham 
Pende 
Perching 
Poyningstown or Chingting 
Southerham 
South Heighton 
Stanmer 
Streethill 
Sutton 
The Lydds 
Tidemills

Warwickshire
Cestersover 
Stretton Baskerville

Wiltshire
East Stowell, Wilcot – abandoned in 19th century; a farm remains
Imber – commandeered for military use in 1943
Marten, Grafton – deserted medieval village
Old Sarum – replaced by Salisbury from 13th century
Shaw, West Overton  – deserted medieval village
Sheldon, Chippenham Without – deserted medieval village
Snap, near Aldbourne – abandoned in early 20th century
Witherington, Downton – abandoned in 15th century; a farm remains
Wyck, near Tisbury – deserted in 14th century

Worcestershire
Elmley Lovett
Grafton Flyford
Rock moated site and medieval village, at Rock

Yorkshire

Argam, in the East Riding of Yorkshire
Easington (in the Forest of Bowland)
East Tanfield, near Ripon
Henderskelfe, near Castle Howard
High Worsall, near Yarm
Howgrave, near Ripon
Newsham, near Bempton
Skipsea DMV, near Skipsea
Stainsby, near Thornaby
Wharram Percy DMV, near Malton,   (One of the best-preserved DMV sites in Britain, now in the care of English Heritage)

Scotland

Aberdeenshire
Forvie, settlement abandoned due to encroaching sand-dunes
Kincardine, formerly the county town of Kincardineshire
Rattray, Aberdeenshire, settlement abandoned due to encroaching sand-dunes

Berwickshire
Bassendean, Scottish Borders
Duns, Modern town 1 km away from the original burgh which was destroyed by the English three times in the 16th century
Langton, original village cleared to make way for parkland and replaced by the modern Gavinton

Caithness
Badbea

East Ayrshire
Glenbuck

East Lothian
East Barns, Dunbar
Tyninghame, original village cleared to make way for parkland in 1761. New village lies to the west.
Yester or Bothans, original village replaced to the North in the 18th century by the planned village of Gifford

Fife
Binnend
Lassodie

Highland
Boreraig, Isle of Skye. Clearance village

Lanarkshire
Bothwellhaugh, inundated under Strathclyde Loch

Moray
Findhorn, original settlement lost to inundation

Na h-Eileanan Siar
St. Kilda, forced evacuation in the early 20th century

Peeblesshire
Hawkshaw, Scottish Borders

Perthshire
Pitmiddle

Roxburghshire
Riccarton Junction, abandoned following the closure of the Waverley Route
Roxburgh, Substantial settlement founded by David I as one of his first Royal Burghs, acted as de facto capital of Scotland, and destroyed repeatedly during the Wars of Scottish Independence. The Royal Burgh was finally abandoned in the late 15th century.

Wales

Anglesey
Nant Mawr, Llaneugrad
Bodgynddelw, Llaneugrad, Farmhouse still exists by modern name 'Bodgynda'.

Powys
Dylife
Llanwddyn, submerged by the Lake Vyrnwy reservoir

Monmouthshire
St. Brides Netherwent
Penterry
Runston
St Pierre, Monmouthshire
Trellech

Neath Port Talbot
Groes, demolished to make way for the M4 motorway

Northern Ireland

Antrim
Galboly Village

References

External links
Deserted medieval villages and other abandoned communities in Britain
Another web site about DMVs and similar sites
Channel 4 TV's Time Team website
List of lost settlements in Berkshire

Lost settlements
 List
 List
Villages in the United Kingdom